Animals in folklore may refer to:

Animals in Australian folklore
Animals in Russian folklore
Animals in Thai folklore
Animals in Japanese folklore